Florian Sittsam (born 14 December 1994) is an Austrian professional footballer who plays for SV Lafnitz.

External links
 
 

1994 births
People from Deutschlandsberg District
Living people
Austrian footballers
Association football midfielders
Austria youth international footballers
Austria under-21 international footballers
SK Sturm Graz players
SV Horn players
SC Wiener Neustadt players
SV Mattersburg players
TSV Hartberg players
Austrian Football Bundesliga players
2. Liga (Austria) players
Austrian Regionalliga players
Footballers from Styria